Fra Benedetto da Fiesole,  also known as Benedetto da Mugello (died 1448) was an Italian artist.

Life
Benedetto was born at the village of Vicchio, in the province of Mugello. he was a brother — probably younger — of the celebrated Fra Angelico, and with him entered the convent of San Domenico at Fiesole, in 1407, taking the name of 'Frater Benedictus,' by which he is usually known. For three years previous to his death, which occurred in 1448, he held the post of superior of that convent. Fra Benedetto was a miniaturist of talent. He illuminated the choral books of San Marco, Florence, and also books in the convent of San Domenico, Fiesole. He is supposed also to have assisted Fra Angelico in his frescoes in San Marco.

References

Sources
 

Year of birth unknown
1448 deaths
15th-century Italian painters
Quattrocento painters
Italian male painters
People from the Province of Florence
Manuscript illuminators